Rachael Doyle (born 26 October 1989) is an Australian football (soccer) player who last played for Central Coast Mariners in the Australian W-League.

Doyle made her debut against Melbourne Victory on 25 October 2008.

External links

 Central Coast Mariners FC profile

1989 births
Living people
Australian women's soccer players
Central Coast Mariners FC (A-League Women) players
A-League Women players
Women's association football defenders